The Shandong Weiqiao Pioneering Group is a Chinese private company active in the textiles industry; it is also the parent company of the aluminium company China Hongqiao Group.

Originating as a towel manufacturer, Weiqiao produces cotton, denim and synthetic fabrics. Zhang Shiping was the moving force behind the company's expansion from the 1970s onward.

The holding company Shandong Weiqiao was founded in 1998.

It has aluminium operations in Indonesia and Guinea.

In 2021, it was ranked 282nd on the Fortune Global 500.

References

External links
 

Chinese companies established in 1994
Companies based in Shandong
Holding companies of China
Aluminium companies of China
Textile companies of China